The Washington–Rochambeau Revolutionary Route is a  series of roads used in 1781 by the Continental Army under the command of George Washington and the Expédition Particulière under the command of Jean-Baptiste de Rochambeau during their 14-week march from Newport, Rhode Island, to Yorktown, Virginia. 4,000 French and 3,000 American soldiers began the march.

French forces left Rhode Island in June 1781 and joined Washington's force on the Hudson River the following month. In August, the combined American and French armies headed south, marching through New Jersey, Pennsylvania, Delaware, and Maryland, a route that allowed them to evade British troops. They reached Williamsburg, Virginia, in late September 1781, several weeks after the French royal fleet had won the Battle of the Chesapeake, preventing the British from reinforcing or evacuating General Cornwallis's army. On September 22, they combined with troops commanded by the Marquis de Lafayette. A three-week siege of Yorktown led to Cornwallis's surrender on October 19, 1781. 

The route is a designated National Historic Trail with interpretive literature, signs, and exhibits that describe the key role of French diplomatic, military, and economic aid to the United States during the American Revolutionary War.

Background

In 1780, French King Louis XVI dispatched Rochambeau, 450 officers, and 5,300 men to help Washington and the colonial forces. They arrived in Narragansett Bay off Newport, Rhode Island, on July 10, 1780. 

In June 1781, Rochambeau prepared to march from Rhode Island to join the Continental Army under George Washington on the Hudson River at Dobbs Ferry, New York. The French commander divided his force into four regiments: "Royal DeuxPonts" under the Baron de Vioménil; "Soissonnais" under the Baron's brother Count de Vioménil; "Saintonge" under the Marquis de Custine; and a fourth regiment. This final unit remained in Providence where it guarded the baggage and munitions stored in the Old Market House and supported the surgeons and attendants at the hospital in University Hall. The advance party would be led by Armand Louis de Gontaut or Duc de Lauzun. His Lauzun's Legion would march ahead of the main army and stay  to the south, protecting the exposed flank from the British.

Rhode Island to New York
Rochambeau and his general staff left the port of Newport, Rhode Island, on June 10, 1781, arriving at Providence the following day. The remainder of his force at Newport was transferred by boat and camped in Providence. The French Army performed a grand review in Providence on June 16, then set out for Coventry, Rhode Island, in four divisions. One division departed each day from June 18 to 21.

The army started leaving the camp ground between Broad and Plain Streets on June 19. They passed through the present Stewart Street to High Street, and west along this to the "junction" (Hoyle Tavern), where they took the road to the left, Cranston Street (then called the Monkey Town road) that went to Knightsville (then Monkeytown). They continued right, following the old Scituate road over Dugaway Hill past the Pippin Orchard School house, over Apple House Hill and Bald Hill, crossing the Pawtuxet River at the village of Kent, and on to Waterman's Tavern—a first day's march of 15 miles.

Waterman's Tavern
Each division had roughly the same amount of artillery and supplies, as well as a field hospital. Rochambeau himself left with the first division (the Bourbonnais Regiment) and arrived at the second camp site in Coventry in the evening of June 18 at a place known as Waterman's Tavern. The route between Providence and Coventry generally followed the alignment of Broadway in Providence to Olneyville, then Route 14 to the eastern side of the Scituate Reservoir. The original road is submerged in the reservoir but picks up again as Old Plainfield Pike in Scituate. West of Route 102 in Foster, the march route resumes following Route 14 into Coventry to the second camp.

Rochambeau's army marched from Coventry through Sterling, Connecticut, via Route 14A (Plainfield Pike) to the third camp in Plainfield opposite Plainfield Cemetery, arriving on June 19. A 3.6-mile portion of the march route between the 2nd and 3rd camps is listed on the National Register of Historic Places (NRHP). Its 2002 NRHP nomination document recorded that "the road retains its narrow, hilly, winding character, and for most of its length, the characteristic borders of stone walls remain in place." The French found this particular segment to be difficult for marching, resulting in the late arrival of some artillery and supply wagons at the Plainfield camp.

Windham
On June 20, Rochambeau's army continued their march along Route 14A to the town of Canterbury, then along Route 14 through Canterbury and Scotland. They arrived in the evening of June 20 at the fourth camp in Windham by the Shetucket River, just west of Windham Center.

Most of Routes 14A and 14 have lost their 18th-century visual character, but several short road segments remain preserved. Some of these road segments have been listed on the National Register of Historic Places. One such segment is Old Canterbury Road in western Plainfield which was bypassed by state highway construction in the 1930s; it preserves some of the features of the original roadway, including the low stone walls lining the road. The designated portion of the route also includes a 1,200-foot section of modern Route 14A east of the eastern end of Old Canterbury Road that maintains visual continuity of Old Canterbury Road.

Another segment that was preserved as a result of being bypassed by the state highway is Manship Road and a portion of Barstow Road (between Manship Road and Route 14) in Canterbury, located midway between Canterbury Center and the village of Westminster. A segment of Route 14 east of Scotland Center has also been recognized as a preserved section of the march route. The designated segment runs from Miller Road to the top of a hill, about 800 feet east of Route 97, known locally as Palmer Road. The low stone walls remain in place on both sides of this road segment, described by the French as "a narrow, steep, and stony road".

Yet another road segment between the third and fourth camps is Scotland Road in Windham, from Back Road to a point about 300 feet east of Ballahamack Road. This portion, also listed on the National Register, was one of the less difficult, according to the French. The road is now mostly modern in appearance, but the expansive views of the surrounding landscape contribute to the visual historical significance of the site, in addition to the preserved stone walls.

Bolton
The French army continued its march through Connecticut on June 21. They went from the camp at Windham past the village of Willimantic, roughly following modern Route 14 and Route 66. They proceeded through Columbia and Andover towards the fifth camp site in Bolton. The march route proceeded along Route 66 then Route 6 until roughly the northwest corner of Andover. The army's fifth camp was located in Bolton Center, but the original road leading there has been unused since the late 19th century and has been overgrown by forest.

The French army continued its march on June 22 from Bolton along Bolton Center Road (partly Route 85), continuing along Middle Turnpike East in Manchester until Route 6. From there they followed Route 6 through Manchester Center to Silver Lane in East Hartford, where the sixth camp was located.

East Hartford
The four divisions had been traveling a day apart. They rested for three nights in East Hartford, necessitating additional camp sites in the same vicinity. Route 6 is a state highway trunk line route, and the surrounding area is heavily urbanized and has lost most of its historic character. However, two sections of the road have been bypassed in Andover and Bolton and remain relatively preserved in their 18th-century appearance.

In Andover, the original march route used what is now Hutchinson Road and Bailey Road. A segment of Hutchinson Road between Route 6 and Henderson Road retains the stone walls and mature trees along the side of the road, as well as the expansive views of open fields towards the Hop River. This road segment is listed on the National Register of Historic Places. The Daniel White Tavern was built in 1773 and used by French officers, and it still stands along this road segment. North of Henderson Road, Hutchinson Road has modern development and no longer has the visual continuity of the southern part of the road.

Bailey Road originally connected Route 6 with Brandy Street in Bolton, but the portion west of the Andover-Bolton town line has since been overgrown and is no longer passable by motor vehicles. A remnant of Bailey Road in Bolton still exists as an unpaved footpath and still retains the characteristic stone walls, as well as two original stone culverts. It, too, is listed on the National Register of Historic Places.

Farmington
The first division of Rochambeau's army crossed the Connecticut River by ferry on June 25 into Hartford, with the other divisions following in one-day intervals as before. From there, they traveled along Farmington Avenue through West Hartford until Farmington, the site of the seventh camp. The camp site was located toward the south end of the town center village. Rochambeau and his officers are said to have stayed at the Elm Tree Inn.

After staying overnight in Farmington Center, the army followed Route 10 on June 26 through the town center of Southington until the Milldale section of town, then headed west along Route 322 until they reached the eighth camp site in the Marion section of Southington. Rochambeau and his officers stayed at the Asa Barnes Tavern.

The following day, they continued westward along Route 322, then Meriden Road into Waterbury. In Waterbury, the route followed East Main Street and West Main Street, crossing the Naugatuck River along the way. The road west of Waterbury was difficult and characterized by the French as being "détestables" for being very stony and mountainous. The route continued into present-day Middlebury, specifically the area around Breakneck Hill. The march route followed Park Road to Watertown Road, then turned south on Watertown Road until Breakneck Hill Road. The ninth camp was located at the foot of Breakneck Hill, where the first division stayed the night of June 27. Rochambeau and his officers were entertained at the Israel Bronson Tavern.

Newtown
On June 28, the first division resumed its march heading south on Artillery Road and Middlebury Road (Route 64) through the town center of Middlebury, continuing along Route 188 and Waterbury Road into the center of Southbury. The army continued west along Main Street South and River Road through Southbury, crossing the Housatonic River into Newtown using a bridge built by the Colonial troops in 1778 at Glen Road. They continued along Church Hill Road through the center of Newtown, where they set up their tenth camp west of the town center. The officers stayed in Caleb Baldwin's Tavern.

Rochambeau reorganized his troops into two brigades in Newtown. The first division resumed its march on June 30, heading west on West Street and Castle Hill Road, then turning north along Reservoir Road and west again on Route 6. The Reservoir Road portion is well preserved and is listed on the National Register of Historic Places. The army marched along Route 6 and Newtown Road into Danbury. In Danbury, the troops used West Wooster Street, Park Avenue, and Backus Avenue to reach the Ridgebury section of the town of Ridgefield. The eleventh camp was set up on July 1 in Ridgebury near the Congregational Church.

Mount Kisco, NY
The French army resumed its march on the morning of July 2 through the town of Ridgefield, heading south on Ridgebury Road then turning west on Mopus Bridge Road. After crossing the New York state line, they continued southwest and south following Route 121 past the hamlets of North Salem and Cross River until the hamlet of Bedford Village. The first brigade set up camp in Bedford Village (12th camp) and resumed the following day while the second brigade skipped the Bedford camp. The French continued west along Route 172 to what is now the village of Mount Kisco, about five miles away west of the Bedford camp.

The French stayed in Mount Kisco for several days until the morning of July 6. They marched west and south for 16 miles along Route 133 and Route 100 to the Hartsdale area of the town of Greenburgh. They camped in several locations in Greenburgh (14th camp) for the next six weeks.

New York to Pennsylvania

Princeton
The 5,000-strong force left Philipsburg Camp in Hartsdale in late August, and after crossing the Hudson River at King's Ferry followed several paths towards Princeton, New Jersey to camp at Morven August 29-31. A monument at Trinity Church, Princeton commemorates the occasion. The troops crossed the Millstone River twice, once at Griggstown Causeway and once at Route 518 near Rocky Hill. The troops left Princeton on August 31 and headed south on the King's Highway towards Trenton.

Trenton
At Trenton on September 2, troops camped at the William Trent House, also known as Bloomsbury and owned by an assistant quartermaster general of the Continental Army. From here, the force crossed over the Delaware River into Pennsylvania.

Philadelphia
The troops roughly followed U.S. Route 13 in Pennsylvania south, crossing the Pennypack Creek Bridge along the way. In Philadelphia, the force camped on the east bank of the Schuylkill River, near the site of the present-day Market Street Bridge and Philadelphia City Hall. By September 5, as the French marched through the city reviewed by the Congress of the Confederation, the Freeman's Journal reported that "the appearance of these troops far exceeds any thing of the kind seen on this continent, and presages the happiest success to the cause of America."

Pennsylvania to Virginia

Philadelphia to Head of Elk and Baltimore

Washington and Rochambeau left Philadelphia by September 5. Washington traveled overland, roughly continuing on modern U.S. Route 13, while Rochambeau embarked on the Delaware River. They met at Chester, Pennsylvania, where Washington shared the news of the French fleet's arrival in the Chesapeake Bay. Washington pressed ahead to Head of Elk, the beginning of navigable Chesapeake waters, to procure transport. About 1,000 American and French troops embarked for Jamestown, while the remainder continued their march through Baltimore and Annapolis. In Baltimore, one French regiment was encamped at Camden Station at the modern intersection of South Howard and West Camden Streets. Across the harbor to the east, a German regiment under French leadership camped along Harford Run (Central Avenue) in Jonestown. Others were situated along the Jones Falls on modern North Charles Street. The French Cavalry, artillery, and baggage train camped just to the north of Market, now Baltimore Street between Paca and Howard Streets. A brigade of American troops rested at Fells Point. The allied forces left Baltimore on September 15.

Williamsburg and Alexandria
Washington and a small group of aides rode ahead and reached his estate at Mount Vernon on September 9, after a six-year absence; Rochambeau and his staff arrived the following day. On September 12, the two commanders continued their journey and arrived in Williamsburg, Virginia, on September 14, gathering the troops and supplies to begin the siege at Yorktown. The allied supply wagon train arrived in Alexandria, Virginia, after a two-day march from Georgetown in late September, including crossing the Potomac River. It occupied a length of about half a mile, north of Oronoco Street and bisected by Washington Street (subsequently the Robert E. Lee Boyhood Home). The wagon train left Alexandria on September 26, heading west, then south.

Washington ordered construction of a wagon road to Wolf Run Shoals on the Occoquan River near Woodbridge, Virginia. The combined American-French force followed this road and crossed the Occoquan to the south on September 27. The wagon train followed modern Virginia State Route 234 to Dumfries, then followed the King's Highway south near Triangle. By the end of September, the wagon train was at Trebell's Landing on the James River, and was then conveyed overland about six miles (via present-day Virginia State Route 238) to the siege lines at Yorktown. The accompanying troops disembarked at landings near Williamsburg.

Further reading

See also
 List of George Washington articles
 List of historic sites preserved along Rochambeau's route
 British colonization of the Americas
 Colonial America
 Colonial American military history
 Colonial history of the United States
 James Manning
 James Mitchell Varnum
 Joseph Webb House
 King's Highway (Charleston to Boston)
 Jean Baptiste, marquis de Traversay
 Louis Marc Antoine de Noailles
 Charles Armand Tuffin
 François-Joseph Paul

References

External links

National Historic Trails of the United States
American Revolutionary War sites
1781 in the United States
Rhode Island in the American Revolution
Connecticut in the American Revolution
New York (state) in the American Revolution
Delaware in the American Revolution
Pennsylvania in the American Revolution
New Jersey in the American Revolution
Maryland in the American Revolution
Virginia in the American Revolution
North Carolina in the American Revolution
Campaigns of the American Revolutionary War
 
National Park Service areas in Rhode Island
National Park Service areas in Connecticut
National Park Service areas in New York (state)
National Park Service areas in Delaware
National Park Service areas in Pennsylvania
National Park Service areas in New Jersey
National Park Service areas in Maryland
National Park Service areas in Virginia
National Park Service areas in North Carolina